Puerto Rico competed at the 2016 Summer Olympics in Rio de Janeiro, Brazil, from 5 to 21 August 2016. This was the nation's eighteenth consecutive appearance at the Summer Olympics.

The Puerto Rico Olympic Committee sent a team of 40 athletes, 13 men and 27 women, to compete in 15 sports at the Games. The nation's full roster in Rio de Janeiro was 15 athletes larger than those who attended the London Games four years earlier, and also featured more female participants than men for the first time. Puerto Rican athletes made their Olympic debut in table tennis, triathlon, and women's indoor volleyball.  Puerto Rico was also represented for the first time in taekwondo after 8 years, diving, equestrian, and tennis after 12 years, and road cycling after 20 years.

Of the 40 participants, twenty-nine of them made their Olympic debut in Rio de Janeiro, including table tennis players Brian Afanador and 15-year-old Adriana Diaz, tennis player Monica Puig, and New York-based taekwondo fighter Crystal Weekes. On the other hand, the remaining eleven athletes on the Puerto Rican squad had past Olympic experience, including swimmer Vanessa García, who became the first woman from her country to compete in four Olympic Games; track star Javier Culson, who captured the bronze medal in the men's 400 m hurdles four years earlier in London; and freestyle wrestler Jaime Espinal (men's 86 kg), who pocketed his country's first silver in nearly three decades. The most successful athlete of the previous Games, Espinal was selected to lead his delegation as the flag bearer in the opening ceremony.

Puerto Rico returned home from Rio de Janeiro with its first ever gold medal in Olympic history. It was awarded to tennis player Puig, who surprisingly defeated Germany's world-ranked Angelique Kerber in the final of the women's singles tournament. Two Puerto Rican athletes, however, came closest to join Puig on the podium: platform diver Rafael Quintero, who rounded out his maiden Games with a seventh-place finish, and Culson, who was disqualified in the men's 400 m hurdles final due to a false start.

Medalists

| width="78%" align="left" valign="top" |

| width="22%" align="left" valign="top" |

| width="22%" align="left" valign="top" |

Athletics (track and field)

Puerto Rican athletes achieved qualifying standards in the following athletics events (up to a maximum of 3 athletes in each event):

Track & road events
Men

Women

Field events

Combined events – Women's heptathlon

Boxing

Puerto Rico entered one boxer to compete in the men's flyweight division into the Olympic boxing tournament. 2012 Olympian Jeyvier Cintrón had claimed his Olympic spot by finishing among the top two boxers in the World Series of Boxing.

Cycling

Road
Puerto Rico was invited by the International Cycling Union to enter one rider in the men's Olympic road race by virtue of his overall individual ranking in the 2015 UCI America Tour, and by occupying one of the four unused berths from the 2015 UCI World Tour, signifying the nation's return to the sport for the first time since 1996.

Diving 

Puerto Rico has entered one diver into the Olympic competition by virtue of a top 18 finish at the 2016 FINA World Cup series.

Equestrian

Puerto Rico has entered one eventing rider into the Olympic equestrian competition by virtue of a top two finish from a combined group of North, Central, & South America in the individual FEI Olympic rankings. This signified the nation's Olympic return to the sport of equestrian for the first time since 2004.

Eventing

Judo

Puerto Rico has qualified two judokas for each of the following weight classes at the Games. London 2012 Olympian Melissa Mojica was ranked among the top 14 eligible judokas for women in the IJF World Ranking List of May 30, 2016, while María Pérez at women's middleweight (70 kg) earned a continental quota spot from the Pan American region, as the highest-ranked Puerto Rican judoka outside of direct qualifying position.

Shooting

Puerto Rico has qualified one shooter to compete in the women's rifle events by virtue of her best finish at the 2015 Pan American Games, as long as she obtained a minimum qualifying score (MQS) by March 31, 2016.

Qualification Legend: Q = Qualify for the next round; q = Qualify for the bronze medal (shotgun)

Swimming

Puerto Rican swimmers have so far achieved qualifying standards in the following events (up to a maximum of 2 swimmers in each event at the Olympic Qualifying Time (OQT), and potentially 1 at the Olympic Selection Time (OST)):

Table tennis

Puerto Rico has entered two athletes into the table tennis competition at the Games. Brian Afanador and 15-year-old Adriana Diaz secured their Olympic spots in the men's and women's singles, respectively by virtue of their top six finish at the 2016 Latin American Qualification Tournament in Santiago, Chile.

Taekwondo

Puerto Rico entered one athlete into the taekwondo competition at the Olympics for the first time since 2008. Crystal Weekes secured a spot in the women's heavyweight category (+67 kg) by virtue of her top two finish at the 2016 Pan American Qualification Tournament in Aguascalientes, Mexico.

Tennis

Puerto Rico has entered one tennis player into the Olympic tournament, signifying the nation's comeback to the sport for the first time since 2004. Monica Puig (world no. 43) qualified directly for the women's singles as one of the top 56 eligible players in the WTA World Rankings as of June 6, 2016.

Triathlon

Puerto Rico has received a spare berth freed up by one of the Germans to send London 2012 Olympian Manuel Huerta to the men's Olympic triathlon as the next highest-ranked individual, not yet qualified, in the ITU Olympic Qualification List as of May 15, 2016, signifying the nation's debut in the sport.

Volleyball

Indoor

Women's tournament

Puerto Rico women's volleyball team qualified for the Olympics by scoring a first-place triumph and securing a lone outright berth at the final meet of the World Olympic Qualifying Tournament in San Juan.

Team roster

Group play

Weightlifting

Puerto Rico has qualified one female weightlifter for the Rio Olympics by virtue of a top four national finish at the 2016 Pan American Championships. The team must allocate this place by June 20, 2016.

Wrestling

Puerto Rico has qualified two wrestlers for each of the following weight classes into the Olympic competition, as a result of their semifinal triumphs at the 2016 Pan American Qualification Tournament.

Men's freestyle

See also
Puerto Rico at the 2015 Pan American Games
Puerto Rico at the 2016 Summer Paralympics

References

External links 

 

Nations at the 2016 Summer Olympics
2016
2016 in Puerto Rican sports